Kåre Pugerup (born 1964 in Viborg) is a diplomat and Chief of Staff at the United Nations agency IFAD in Rome. Previously he served at the Ministry for Foreign Affairs in Stockholm where he was a Project Director at the Department for International Development Cooperation. He earned a BSc and MSc in Business Administration and Economics at Uppsala University, Sweden.

External links
 http://www.ifad.org
 http://www.brettonwoodsproject.org/art-15312
 http://www.egdi.gov.se/dev_financing/pdf/dev_finance_exsum2.pdf

Swedish diplomats
1964 births
Living people
International Fund for Agricultural Development people
Swedish officials of the United Nations
People from Viborg Municipality